= Dysgedydd y Plant =

Welsh periodical

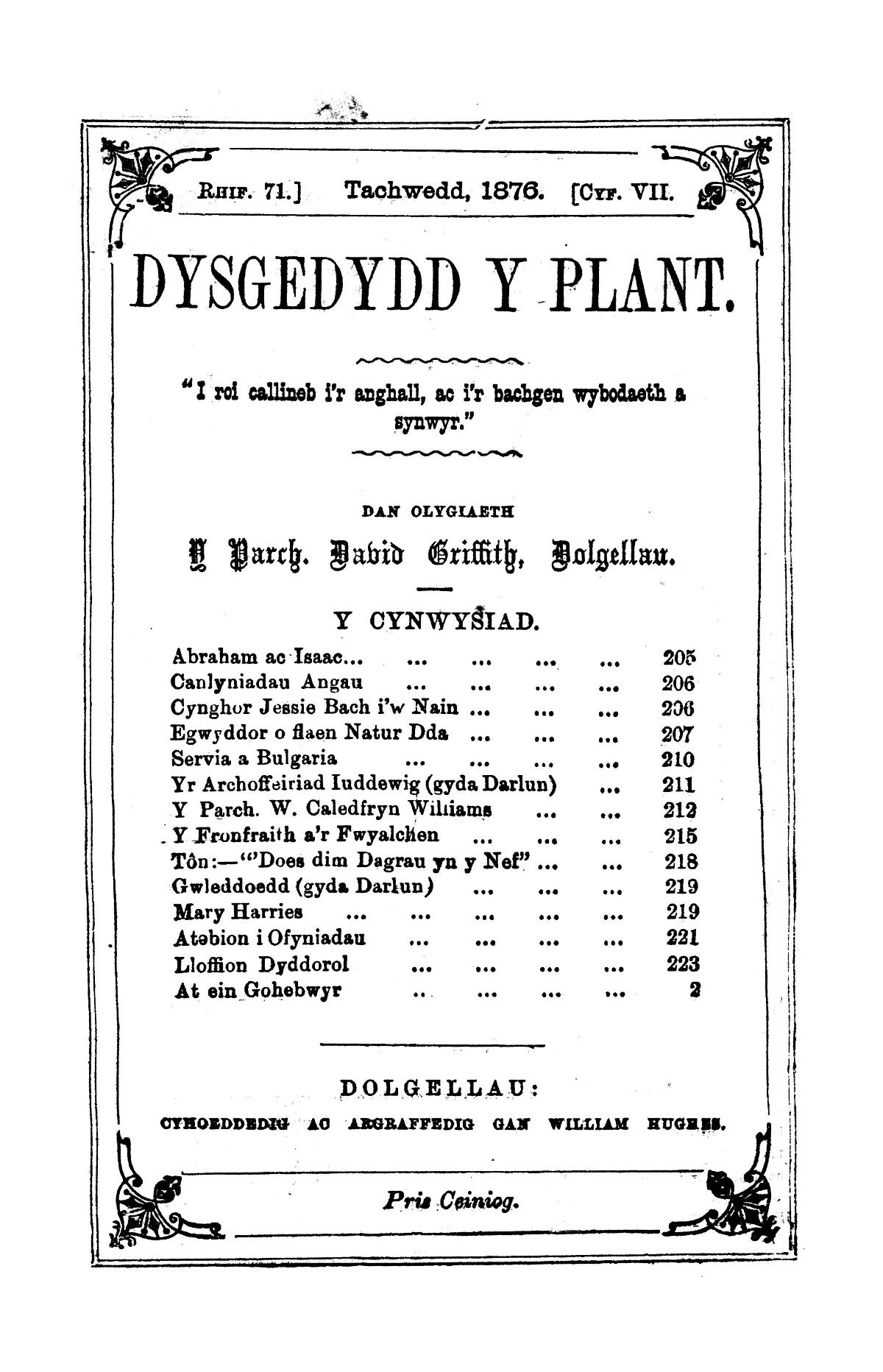
Dysgedydd y plant (Welsh Journal)

Dysgedydd y Plant was a Welsh language periodical produced for use by Congregationalist Church Sunday schools. It was first published in Dolgellau by W Hughes in 1871. The articles it contained covered religious and general educational subjects, including biographies. Its editors included David Griffith (1823–1913) and Richard Roberts (1871–1935). At a time when state schools punished children for speaking Welsh, children's publications such as this were important in preserving the skills of reading and writing in the Welsh language.
